A list of thriller films released in the before 1940.

Notes

1920s thriller films
1930s thriller films
1920s
Lists of 1920s films by genre
Lists of 1930s films by genre